Stratford Centre is a shopping mall and indoor market in Stratford town centre in east London. It is situated opposite the busy Stratford Regional station and this contributes to the high footfall through the centre, currently at around 26 million visitors every year, as many people use it as a cut-through between the stations and Stratford Broadway.

The centre currently has 62 retail units, internally and externally, plus, off the East Mall is the Market Village, which contains many small independent traders, and in the West Mall is a market that trades Monday to Saturday.

History 
It was built by Ravenseft Properties Limited, and opened in 1974. Refurbished and partially extended in 1998 it comprises 330,000 sq. ft. on a single level, it was sold by Land Securities to Catalyst European Property Fund LP in 2010.

In 2017, an acid attack involving a noxious substance took place at the centre. Six people were injured.

During 2018, the Stratford Centre was closed after 50 shops were flooded by a burst water main on Stratford Broadway, where the flood water was a depth of around eight inches.

Stores 
Stores include:
Apple Jacks Health Shop, Barclays Bank, Baseo, Blue Inc, Boots, Burger King, Card Factory, Car Phone Warehouse, CeX, Chopstix Noodle Bar, Clarks, Costa Coffee, Creams, Dewhurst Butchers, Discount Second Hand Jewellers, EE, Footlocker, Granier Bakery & Café, Greggs, H Samuel Jewellers, Halifax Bank, Healthy Planet, Holland & Barrett, HSBC Bank, illusion, J D Sport, KFC, Lituancia, Loon Fung, McDonald's, Milano Couture, New Look, Notting Hill, O2 Store, Osbon Pharmacy, Paul Harrison Jewellers, Peacocks, Percy Ingle Bakers, Pizza Hut, Poundland, Risky, Sainsbury's, Shoe Zone, Shuklas / Stratford News, SpecSavers, Sports Direct, Starbucks, Subway, Superdrug, The Body Shop, The Business Lab, The Fragrance Shop, The Perfume Shop, The Works, Warren James.

The centre is proposing to re-develop the site, with a 26-story residential building for students and to have additional parking and shops in the shopping centre.

Access
To the north of the site lies Stratford station which is served by London Underground's Central and Jubilee lines, Greater Anglia, Elizabeth line, London Overground, Docklands Light Railway, and a number of c2c services.

The centres central thoroughfare is called the West Mall and is an indoor car-free street market between Stratford Broadway and Great Eastern Street is classed as a public highway and by law is kept open 24 hours a day, although most of the shops close at night.

There is also a multi-storey car park which is open 24 hours a day and linked via lifts and stairwell in the West Mall.

References

External links 
Stratford Centre Website
Market Village Website

Stratford, London
Streets in the London Borough of Newham
Retail markets in London
Shopping centres in the London Borough of Newham
Shopping malls established in 1974
1974 establishments in England